Luis Cajaiba is a Brazilian Muay Thai fighter. He is the former WBC Muaythai World Welterweight champion.

Muay Thai career
In June 2019, Luis fought Chadd Collins for the vacant WBC Muaythai World Welterweight title. He won the fight by decision.

In July 2019, Cajaiba fought Talaythong Chor Thanapetch for the Thailand Super Welterweight Muay thai title. He won the fight by decision.

In September 2019, Cajaiba fought Valentin Thibaut for the WBC Muay Thai Diamond Super Welterweight title. He lost the fight by decision.

Cajaiba was scheduled to fight the reigning Lumpini Stadium 160 lb champion Sorgraw Petchyindee at Road to ONE 6: WSS.

Championships and awards 

 2019 WBC Muay Thai World 147 lb Champion

 2019 Thailand 154 lb Champion
 2020 IMC Super Welterweight Champion

Muay Thai record

|- style="background:#cfc" 
| 2023-01-21 || Win ||align="left" | Thai Rithy || LWC Super Champ, Lumpinee Stadium|| Bangkok, Thailand || Decision || 3 || 3:00

|- style="background:#fbb" 
| 2022-11-18 || Loss||align="left" | Yodwicha Por Boonsit || Rajadamnern World Series - Semi Final|| Bangkok, Thailand || Decision (Unanimous) ||3  ||3:00

|- style="background:#cfc" 
| 2022-10-14 || Win ||align="left" | Reza VenumMuaythai || Rajadamnern World Series - Group Stage|| Bangkok, Thailand ||Decision (Unanimous) ||3  ||3:00

|- style="background:#cfc" 
| 2022-09-09 || Win ||align="left" | Saenpon Petchpachara || Rajadamnern World Series - Group Stage  || Bangkok, Thailand || Decision (Unanimous) ||3  ||3:00 
|-  style="background:#cfc;"
| 2022-08-05|| Win||align=left| Satanfah Sitsongpeenong || Rajadamnern World Series - Group Stage || Bangkok, Thailand ||  Decision (Majority)|| 3 ||3:00 
|- style="background:#fbb" 
| 2022-04-16 || Loss||align="left" | Rungrat Pumpanmuang || Suekjaomuaythai, Omnoi Stadium|| Samut Sakhon, Thailand || Decision (Unanimous) || 5 ||3:00
|-
! style=background:white colspan=9 |
|-  style="background:#cfc;"
| 2022-02-26|| Win ||align=left| Talaytong Sor.Thanaphet || Muaythai Lumpinee TKO, Lumpinee Stadium || Bangkok, Thailand || Decision || 5 || 3:00
|-  style="background:#fbb;"
| 2022-01-30|| Loss||align=left| Rungrat Pumpanmuang || Chang MuayThai Kiatpetch Amarin Super Fight, Rajadamnern Stadium || Bangkok, Thailand || Decision ||5 ||3:00 
|-  style="background:#cfc;"
| 2021-12-30|| Win ||align=left| Bangpleenoi PetchyindeeAcademy ||Muay Thai SAT Super Fight WiteetinThai || Phuket, Thailand || Decision ||5 ||3:00 
|-  style="background:#cfc;"
| 2021-10-31|| Win ||align=left| Sornkaw Sitkamnanleu ||Chang MuayThai Kiatpetch Amarin Super Fight + Moradok Kon Thai || Buriram province, Thailand || Decision|| 5 || 3:00
|-  style="background:#FFBBBB;"
| 2021-03-27|| Loss ||align=left| Satanfah Rachanon || WSS Fights, World Siam Stadium || Bangkok, Thailand || KO (Right Elbow) || 4 ||
|-  style="background:#cfc;"
| 2021-02-28|| Win ||align=left| Sorgraw Petchyindee Academy || WSS Fights, World Siam Stadium || Bangkok, Thailand || Decision|| 5 || 3:00
|-  style="background:#cfc;"
| 2020-11-22|| Win ||align=left| Guanyu AyothayaFightGym|| Muay Thai Super Champ || Bangkok, Thailand || Decision|| 3 || 3:00
|-  style="background:#cfc;"
| 2020-09-22|| Win ||align=left| Wanchalerm NuanthongSnookerKluahrae1T || Rangsit Stadium || Rangsit, Thailand || Decision|| 5 || 3:00
|-
! style=background:white colspan=9 |
|-  style="background:#FFBBBB;"
| 2019-09-24|| Loss ||align=left| Valentin Thibaut || Lumpinee Stadium || Bangkok, Thailand || Decision || 5 || 3:00
|-
! style=background:white colspan=9 |
|-  style="background:#cfc;"
| 2019-07-24|| Win ||align=left| Talaytong Sor.Thanaphet|| Lumpinee Stadium || Bangkok, Thailand || Decision || 5 || 3:00
|-
! style=background:white colspan=9 |
|-  style="background:#cfc;"
| 2019-06-18|| Win ||align=left| Chadd Collins || Petchnumnoi + Prestige Fight Lumpinee Stadium || Bangkok, Thailand || Decision || 5 || 3:00
|-
! style=background:white colspan=9 |
|-  style="background:#cfc;"
| 2019-04-27|| Win ||align=left| Arandet M16 || Omnoi Stadium || Bangkok, Thailand || Decision || 5 || 3:00
|-  style="background:#cfc;"
| 2019-02-17|| Win ||align=left| Saenpol || Lumpinee Stadium || Bangkok, Thailand || Decision || 5 || 3:00
|-  style="background:#FFBBBB;"
| 2019-01-10|| Loss ||align=left| Talaytong Sor.Thanaphet || Lumpinee Stadium || Bangkok, Thailand || Decision || 5 || 3:00
|-  style="background:#FFBBBB;"
| 2018-11-30|| Loss ||align=left| Talaytong Sor.Thanaphet || Lumpinee Stadium || Bangkok, Thailand || Decision || 5 || 3:00
|-
! style=background:white colspan=9 |
|-  style="background:#FFBBBB;"
| 2018-11-04|| Loss ||align=left| Rambo Petch Por.Tor.Aor|| Muay Thai Super Champ || Bangkok, Thailand || Decision || 3 || 3:00
|-  style="background:#cfc;"
| 2018-09-25|| Win||align=left| Chaidet M-16 || Lumpinee Stadium || Bangkok, Thailand || Decision ||5 || 3:00
|-  style="background:#FFBBBB;"
| 2018-08-25|| Loss ||align=left| Satanfah Rachanon || Thai Fight || Bangkok, Thailand || Decision ||3 || 3:00
|-  style="background:#FFBBBB;"
| 2018-07-22|| Loss ||align=left| Rungrat Pumpanmuang  || Muay Thai Super Champ || Bangkok, Thailand || Decision || 3 || 3:00
|-  style="background:#cfc;"
| 2018-07-01|| Win ||align=left| Samingdet Dekfaifah  || Muay Thai Super Champ || Bangkok, Thailand || KO (Elbow) || 2 ||
|-  style="background:#FFBBBB;"
| 2018-04-28|| Loss ||align=left| Sibmuen Sitchefboontham  || All Star Fight 3 || Bangkok, Thailand || Decision || 5 || 3:00
|-  style="background:#FFBBBB;"
| 2018-03-17|| Loss ||align=left| Singmanee Kaewsamrit  || Miracle Muay Thai Festival, Semi Final || Thailand || Decision || 5 || 3:00
|-  style="background:#cfc;"
| 2018-03-17|| Win||align=left| Pavel  || Miracle Muay Thai Festival, Quarter Final || Thailand || Decision || 5 || 3:00
|-  style="background:#cfc;"
| 2017-12-26|| Win ||align=left| Lukton Pumphanmuang || Lumpinee Stadium || Bangkok, Thailand || Decision || 5 || 3:00
|-  style="background:#cfc;"
| 2017-11-10|| Win ||align=left| Bardon MewMuaythai || Lumpinee Stadium || Bangkok, Thailand || Decision || 5 || 3:00
|-  style="background:#cfc;"
| 2017-06-16|| Win ||align=left| Beckham Tanaimichel || Lumpinee Stadium || Bangkok, Thailand || KO (Right elbow) || 2 ||
|-  style="background:#cfc;"
| 2016-09-24|| Win ||align=left| Cadu Portela || Top Thai Brasil V  || Brazil || Decision || 5 || 3:00
|-  style="background:#cfc;"
| 2016-08-07|| Win ||align=left| Paulo Tiago || Heart Of Fighters II  || Brazil || Decision || 3 || 3:00
|-  style="background:#FFBBBB;"
| 2016-05-14|| Loss ||align=left| Wagner Victor || Epic Muaythai Brasil, Final || Sao Paulo, Brazil || Decision || 5 || 3:00
|-  style="background:#cfc;"
| 2016-05-14|| Win ||align=left| Julio Lobo || Epic Muaythai Brasil, Semi Final || Sao Paulo, Brazil || Decision || 5 || 3:00
|-  style="background:#cfc;"
| 2016-03-05|| Win ||align=left| Petros Cabelinho || Epic Muaythai Brasil 2, Final || Brazil || Decision || 5 || 3:00
|-  style="background:#cfc;"
| 2016-03-05|| Win ||align=left| Samuel Matias || Epic Muaythai Brasil 2, Semi Final || Brazil || KO (Punches) || 3 ||
|-  style="background:#cfc;"
| 2016-02-20|| Win ||align=left| Thalison "Monstrão" || Epic Muaythai Brasil 1, Semi Final || Brazil || Decision || 5 || 3:00
|-  style="background:#cfc;"
| 2015-09|| Win ||align=left| Julio Lobo || Maximum Muay Thai 2 || Brazil || Decision || 5 || 3:00
|-  style="background:#cfc;"
| 2015-06-27|| Win ||align=left| Lukinhas "Pilha Fraca" ||  || Brazil || Decision || 5 || 3:00
|-  style="background:#cfc;"
| 2015-03-28|| Win ||align=left| Jonathan Ferreira ||  || Brazil || Decision || 5 || 3:00
|-  style="background:#c5d2ea;"
| 2014-12-14|| Draw||align=left| Leandro Duarte || King Thai || Brazil || Decision || 3 || 3:00
|-
| colspan=9 | Legend:

See also
List of male kickboxers

References 

1996 births
Brazilian Muay Thai practitioners 
Brazilian male kickboxers
People from Vitória da Conquista
Living people
Sportspeople from Bahia